"My Recovery Injection" is a song by Biffy Clyro from their 2004 album Infinity Land and was the second single from the album. It was their ninth single overall and reached number 24 on the UK Singles Chart.

Track listings
All songs were written by Simon Neil.

CD (BBQ284CD)
 "My Recovery Injection" (edit) – 3:14
 "Its Always The Quiet Ones" – 2:58
 "Corfu" – 6:29

DVD (BBQ284DVD)
 "My Recovery Injection" (video) - 3:14
 "The Making of..." (video)

7-inch (BBQ379)
 "My Recovery Injection" – 4:13
 "Diary of Always" (acoustic)

Personnel
 Simon Neil – guitar, vocals
 James Johnston – bass, vocals
 Ben Johnston – drums, vocals
 Chris Sheldon – producer

Charts

References

External links
 "My Recovery Injection" Lyrics
 "My Recovery Injection" Guitar Tablature
 "My Recovery Injection" Music Video

Biffy Clyro songs
2004 singles
2004 songs
Beggars Banquet Records singles
Song recordings produced by Chris Sheldon
Songs written by James Johnston (Scottish musician)
Songs written by Simon Neil